Graham Lee Deakin (born 24 April 1987) is an English footballer assistant manager and former player who is currently assistant manager of  side Hednesford Town. As a player, he spent most of his career playing as a midfielder.

Playing career

Walsall
Deakin played one first team match for Walsall in the Football League Trophy semi final on 24 January 2006.

Walsall met Swansea City in the semi-final, Swansea City took an early lead through Leon Knight. Walsall eventually equalised through an Alex Nicholls goal in the second half. Andy Robinson gave Swansea the lead in the 83rd minute but his goal was quickly cancelled out by an equaliser from James Constable which sent the match to extra-time. Deakin was introduced to the action during extra-time, coming on as a 108th-minute substitute for David McDermott. The match eventually required a penalty shoot-out. The opening eight penalties were all successfully converted before the following four were all missed. The shootout ended when Deakin missed his side's eighth penalty, allowing Alan Tate to convert the winning penalty for Swansea.

Tamworth
Deakin signed for Conference National 
side Tamworth on loan on the 31 August 2006.

Sutton Coldfield Town
Following a brief spell with Rushall Olympic, Deakin returned to sign for Sutton Coldfield Town on 24 August 2014.

Personal life
Deakin's father, Graham Sr., died in 2022 from injuries sustained while trying to take his own life. Subsequently, Deakin has helped to set up a West Midlands mental health hub specifically for men, as well as linking up with non-profit organisation Sport Against Suicide.

Career statistics

Club

References

External links

1987 births
Living people
English footballers
Footballers from Birmingham, West Midlands
Association football midfielders
National League (English football) players
English Football League players
Walsall F.C. players
Tamworth F.C. players
Sutton Coldfield Town F.C. players
Rushall Olympic F.C. players